Forrest Fred White (21 May 1920 in West Virginia - 22 November 1994 in Banning, California) was an American musical instruments industry executive, best known for his association with Fender Musical Instruments Corporation.

White began working at Fender on 20 May 1954, eventually becoming its vice president.  Leo Fender named a line of student amplifiers and steel guitars after him in 1955.  White remained with the company until December 1966.  He was also a partner with Fender in the Music Man company after both men left Fender.

Later in 1994, White wrote and published a book called "Fender: The Inside Story" (Pub Group West) on the relationship he had with Leo Fender.

References

1920 births
1994 deaths
People from West Virginia
Fender people